Orchestra America (OA) is a nonprofit organization that promotes orchestral high school music education through positively life-changing events and workshops. As a division of Bands of America? it merged in 2006 with the "Music for All Foundation," which also sought to provide performance opportunities and musical education opportunities for schools and communities.

Summer Symposium
Orchestra America's first event was the Orchestra Track at Bands of America Summer Symposium. A week-long, workshop for string students. Emphasis is placed on leadership skills and building elements for the student to take back to his or her orchestra.

Honor Orchestra of America
In 2005, the Honor Orchestra of America debuted with the Honor Band of America at the National Concert Band Festival. The honors ensemble was composed of high school string, wind, and percussion students from across the country. The group has since performed under the batons of Scott O'Neill (2005), Benjamin Zander (2006), Larry Livingston (2007, 2008, 2009, 2010, 2011, 2012) and Anthony Maiello (2010). The group has also shared the stage with world-class guest soloists including Christopher O'Reilly (2006), Pinchas Zukerman (2007), Barnabas Kelemen (2008), and Shelly Berg (2009).

Orchestra America National Festival
The Orchestra America National Festival debuted in 2006? with six full and string orchestras. The Festival is a part of the Music for All National Festival. Ensembles perform in a non-competitive setting to an audience of peers. The Festival is free and open to the public with concerts held at the Hilbert Circle Theatre, home of the Indianapolis Symphony Orchestra.

Orchestra America is an operating division of Music for All, Inc., a 501(c)(3) organization headquartered in Indianapolis, Indiana.

References

External links
 Official website of Orchestra America
 Website of parent organization Music for All

Music education in the United States
Music organizations based in the United States